Nemacheilus binotatus is a species of ray-finned fish in the genus Nemacheilus which is found in the Chao Phraya and Maeklong basins in Thailand.

Footnotes 

 

B
Fish described in 1933